Basavraj Madhavrao Patil is a member of the 13th Maharashtra Legislative Assembly. He represents the Ausa Assembly Constituency. He belongs to the Indian National Congress. coming from Lingayat community. He was one of standing minister who lost the election in 2004 to Ravindra Vishvanath Gaikwad. https://resultuniversity.com/election/omerga-maharashtra-assembly-constituency . He also lost the 2019 election to new entrant Abhimanyu Pawar.

Political career 
He was ex minister of Maharashtra in 1999-2004. He was MLA from Omerga-lohara constituency. Also he was MLA from Ausa constituency in 12th and 13th assembly of Maharashtra.

Positions held 
Ex gramvikas minister of Maharashtra .

3 time MLA from Omerga and Ausa constituency. He is president of vithal sai sugar factory. He is specially known for his way . Now Mr patil is working president of maharashtra pradesh congress committee.

References

Maharashtra MLAs 2014–2019
Indian National Congress politicians
Living people
People from Latur district
Marathi politicians
1957 births
Indian National Congress politicians from Maharashtra